Květa Peschke and Katarina Srebotnik were the defending champions, but Peschke chose not to participate. Srebotnik played alongside Caroline Garcia, but lost in the semifinals to Martina Hingis and Sania Mirza.
Tímea Babos and Kristina Mladenovic won the title, defeating Hingis and Mirza in the final, 6–4, 6–3.

Seeds
The top four seeds receive a bye into the second round.

Draw

Finals

Top half

Bottom half

References
 Main Draw

Italian Open - Doubles
Women's Doubles